Pedro Gil Vieira is a Portuguese theoretical physicist who has done significant work in the area of quantum field theory and quantum gravity. One of his most important contributions is the exact solution for the spectrum of a four-dimensional quantum field theory, finite coupling proposal for polygonal Wilson loops and three point functions in N=4 Super Yang-Mills.

Awards
Pedro Vieira has received these awards:
 2015 – Alfred P. Sloan Foundation Fellowship
 2015 – Gribov Medal
 2018 – Raymond and Beverly Sackler International Prize in Physics
 2020 – New Horizons in Physics Prize, Breakthrough Prize Foundation

References

Portuguese physicists
Living people
1982 births